Jack Lowe (24 October 1890 – 1 May 1944) was an Australian rules footballer who played for Collingwood and Carlton in the Victorian Football League (VFL).

Lowe began his career at Collingwood and kicked 17 goals for them in 1913 before crossing to Carlton the following year. His last league match was the 1914 VFL Grand Final, where he played from the half forward pocket in Carlton's win over South Melbourne.

He died from pneumonia on 1 May 1944.

References

Holmesby, Russell and Main, Jim (2007). The Encyclopedia of AFL Footballers. 7th ed. Melbourne: Bas Publishing.

Australian rules footballers from Victoria (Australia)
Collingwood Football Club players
Carlton Football Club players
Carlton Football Club Premiership players
Seymour Football Club players
1890 births
1944 deaths
Deaths from pneumonia in Australia
One-time VFL/AFL Premiership players